Asad Iqbal Abro  (born 4 July 2000 ) is a Pakistani Taekwondo martial artist. He represented his country at the 2017 Asian indoor champion Pakistan. He won a gold in and qualified for international taekwondo championship.

Personal best

References

External links

1986 births
Living people
Pakistani male sprinters
South Asian Games bronze medalists for Pakistan
South Asian Games medalists in athletics
Islamic Solidarity Games competitors for Pakistan
21st-century Pakistani people